The String Quintet No. 2 in C minor, K. 406/516b, was written by Wolfgang Amadeus Mozart in 1787. Like all of Mozart's string quintets, it is a "viola quintet" in that it is scored for string quartet and an extra viola (two violins, two violas and cello). Unlike his other string quintets, however, the work was not originally written for strings. Having completed the two string quintets K. 515 and K. 516, Mozart created a third by arranging his Serenade No. 12 for Winds in C minor K. 388/384a, written in 1782 or 1783 as a string quintet. Although by then Mozart was entering each new work into his catalogue of compositions, he did not enter this quintet, perhaps because it was an arrangement rather than a new work.

Since the wind serenade used pairs of oboes and clarinets, it was a straightforward matter to map these to the pairs of violins and violas. The arrangement is so successful that Richard Wigmore asserts, in his sleeve notes to the recording by the Nash Ensemble that "without prior knowledge few would guess that the work was not conceived for string quintet, even if the textures (except in the minuet) are generally simpler, less polyphonic than in K515 and 516".

Movements

The work is in standard four movement form:
I. Allegro  (cut time) in C minor

Mozart contrasts the stark opening theme with a lyrical second subject in the relative major – E flat. However, in the recapitulation the second subject returns in C minor, rather than C major, allowing the whole movement to conclude uncompromisingly in C minor.

II. Andante  in E-flat major

The lyrical slow movement is unremarkable structurally. However, throughout the work Mozart made small adjustments to the musical material of the original wind serenade when rewriting the music for strings, one of which can be heard in the second subject of this movement. In the string quintet version, he inserts a chromatic note into the descending scale motif, and adjusts the rhythm to accommodate it.

III. Menuetto in canone  in C minor, with Trio in canone al rovescio in C major

The Menuetto is a canon in which the violin enters first, with the cello following at an interval of one bar.

The trio, in the major, is a double Mirror canon, in which the second viola is silent. In it, each answering voice plays the previous musical material upside-down.

IV. Allegro  in C minor (ending in C major)

The last movement is a set of variations which, Wigmore   points out, often treats the theme quite freely.  The fifth variation, begun softly by violas (horns in the original wind version) is on a larger scale and is in the relative major key of C minor, E flat major. The seventh variation explores the theme with chromatic harmonies. It is only with the final variation that the work finally turns to C major.

References

External links

String quintets by Wolfgang Amadeus Mozart
1787 compositions
Compositions in C minor